Bee Creek may refer to:

Bee Creek (Elk Fork Salt River tributary), a stream in Missouri
Bee Creek (Missouri River tributary), a stream in Missouri